Manfred Kallenbach (8 April 1942 in Dresden – 21 April 2010 in Dresden) was a German goalkeeper and East German Champion.  He played for SG Dynamo Dresden and BSG Stahl Riesa.

Literature 
 Hanns Leske: Enzyklopädie des DDR-Fußballs. Die Werkstatt, Göttingen 2007, 
 Andreas Baingo, Michael Horn: Geschichte der DDR-Oberliga. Göttingen 2007, 
 Uwe Nuttelmann: DDR-Oberliga. Eigenverlag 2007,

References
Obituary

1942 births
2010 deaths
German footballers
East German footballers
Dynamo Dresden players
DDR-Oberliga players
Footballers from Dresden
Association football goalkeepers
German footballers needing infoboxes